The former St. Stephen's Episcopal Church also known as St. Stephen's Church, is an historic stone Gothic Revival-style Episcopal church building located on the southeast  corner of 3rd Avenue and 5th Street in Casselton, North Dakota, United States.

Built in 1886, it was designed by British-born Fargo architect George Hancock and built by stonemason Nathaniel Maconachie. It was consecrated in August, 1887, and shared ministers with the Old Stone Church (Calvary Episcopal) in Buffalo for many years.

After the congregation dwindled, the building was sold in 1950 to the Casselton Mennonite Church, which worshiped in it until 2002, when the building was closed again. In 2004, the Mennonite congregation donated the church to the Casselton Heritage Center, Inc., which now operates it as a community center.

On December 3, 1992, it was added to the National Register of Historic Places.

References

External links

Episcopal church buildings in North Dakota
Gothic Revival church buildings in North Dakota
Mennonite church buildings in North Dakota
Churches on the National Register of Historic Places in North Dakota
Churches completed in 1886
Stone churches in North Dakota
Historic American Buildings Survey in North Dakota
19th-century Episcopal church buildings
National Register of Historic Places in Cass County, North Dakota
1886 establishments in Dakota Territory
Community centers in the United States